Eboni K. Williams is an American lawyer and television host. She co-hosts the late-night talk show State of the Culture on Revolt TV. She co-hosted a talk show on WABC Radio in New York City and was a co-host of Fox News' 2017 show Fox News Specialists. In October 2020, she was cast in The Real Housewives of New York City for its thirteenth season.

Early life
Williams was raised by a single mother. She received her Bachelor of Arts in Communications and African American studies at University of North Carolina at Chapel Hill, and her Juris Doctor from Loyola University New Orleans College of Law. As a law student, Williams clerked for the Louisiana Secretary of State and the Louisiana Attorney General's office, and assisted New Orleans council-members in the aftermath of Hurricane Katrina.

Career
In 2008, Williams provided legal counsel in family law and civil litigation. She was a public defender and returned to private practice in 2010. Williams provided representation for clients in homicide, rape, drug, sex crime, and federal offense cases. She was a correspondent for CBS News and a contributor for Fox News, with appearances on Hannity and The O’Reilly Factor, and has appeared as a co-host on Outnumbered and The Five. Williams was a co-host for the Fox News Specialists afternoon show that first aired May 1, 2017, with co-hosts Eric Bolling and Katherine Timpf. The show was created after the departure of Bill O'Reilly to rebuild the Fox News Channel lineup. Fox News Specialists was cancelled on September 8, 2017, after Eric Bolling departed from the network amid sexual harassment allegations.

On June 5, 2017, Williams joined WABC Radio as co-host of a noon-to-3 p.m. talk show along with long-time radio personality Curtis Sliwa, replacing Ron Kuby as Sliwa's co-host on the show. Her last show aired October 18, 2017.

Williams described her time with Fox as "wonderful. But I knew that, and I didn’t go there to be comfortable. Let me be clear, I did not walk into Fox News to be comfortable. I walked in there to disrupt."

Williams hosts the program State of the Culture on Revolt TV.

In October 2020, she was cast as the first African-American member of The Real Housewives of New York City, joining its 13th season before the shows recast in season 14.

Bibliography
 Pretty Powerful (2016) .

References

External links
</ref>
Eboni Williams archived biography at Fox News

Living people
University of North Carolina at Chapel Hill alumni
Loyola University New Orleans alumni
African-American journalists
African-American women lawyers
African-American lawyers
African-American television hosts
American political commentators
American women lawyers
Fox News people
Alpha Kappa Alpha members
1983 births
21st-century African-American people
21st-century African-American women
20th-century African-American people
20th-century African-American women
Participants in American reality television series
Public defenders